The Northern Tower is a building in Moscow, located on plot 19 of the Moscow International Business Center. The Northern Tower was built by Strabag SE, with construction starting in 2005 and finishing in 2007.

The height of the building is 108 m, and the total floor area is 135,000 m². In the tower there are office suites, restaurants, cafes, a fitness centre and a parking lot.

Among the largest tenants of the building are Raiffeisenbank, Transtelekom, General Motors, Hyundai Motor, and Motorola.

Gallery

External links

Moscow International Business Center
Skyscraper office buildings in Moscow
Residential skyscrapers in Moscow